Ordinaries in heraldry are sometimes embellished with stripes of colour alongside them, have lumps added to them, shown with their edges arciform instead of straight, have their peaks and tops chopped off, pushed up and down out of the usual positions, or even broken apart.

Cottices

Cottices, also spelled cottises, cotises, cotices, cotizes, are narrow stripes beside and parallel to an ordinary.

Cottices can take exotic line variations and even charge-like shapes.

Nowy

An ordinary with a circular boss in the middle is described as nowy.

An ordinary with a square boss is called quadrate or, more fully, nowy quadrate.
A saltire quadrate has the square boss turned lozengeways, with edges parallel to those of the saltire.
An ordinary with a lozenge-shaped boss is called nowy lozengy or nowy of a lozenge (applies also to saltires)

Nowy and quadrate are usually applied only to the cross, saltire, pale, fess and bend.

Facetting

An ordinary, perhaps especially a cross, might, like diamonds and mullets, be facetted, but examples of facetted ordinaries in actual heraldry are extremely hard to find.

Embowed
An ordinary embowed has the edges bowed inwards producing a concavity; this is sometimes more explicitly blazoned inwardly embowed.  Its opposite is enarched.

This variation is most often applied to the chevron and pile.

The term embowed is also applied to bent arms and legs, arched fish, and serpents in circles.

Ecimé and other modified chevrons

The chevron ecimé has its peak "blunted", i.e. squared off rather than meeting in a point. Much more common is couped at the peak (or point) or even truncated. In the Canadian Public Register truncated is used in the Anglophone versions of blazons, and ecimé in the Francophone ones.

The chevron disjointed or disjoined has the central, pointed portion missing.[5] The chevron éclaté has each end with roughly-made points or spikes on it.[6]. The chevron brisy (or brisé) as in the Scots Public Register, vol 52, p54 also has the point part removed though in this case the two remaining sections are squared off and 'lean' against each other, as can be seen in the French coat of Meaudre de la Pouyade.[7]

The Armorial de Gelre shows Bernard v.d. Wilten as bearing a "fasce palissée" (similar to a fess embattled with long merlons and the ends rounded).

Enhanced and abased

An ordinary enhanced is placed higher in the field than its usual position.

When an ordinary is shown lower down the shield than its usual position, it is described as debased or abased or abaisse or dehanced.

Rompu

An ordinary rompu is "broken" in some way, though the form of the breaking may vary considerably and may perhaps need further description to avoid confusion.

An example is the chevronels rompu in the arms of Danzé, Loir et Cher, France. A chevron 'rompu' has the central section shifted vertically upward, as in the coat of the US 278th Armored Infantry Battalion.   (There is an example of a chevron double rompu reversed in the arms of USCGC Biscayne Bay.)  A bend rompu arraswise of an unusual form can be found in the arms of the 99th Air Base Wing of the United States Air Force. "Rompu" should be distinguished from "fracted".  The arms of the Roossenekal Local Area Committee are Per chevron Gules and Azure,  a chevron fracted and embattled to chief Or, between in chief a rose Argent, barbed and seeded, and in base a cross fleuretty, Or.  The form of the "fracting" can be specified.

An ordinary affaissée, in French heraldry, is wavy in the form of a depression in its middle.

The word rompu is also applied to a common charge which is broken, e.g. "a circular chain with link rompu at the top", although this is more usually blazoned as fracted.

See also
 Line (heraldry)

References

Bibliography 
 Boutell's Heraldry (revised by J.P. Brooke-Little, Norroy and Ulster King of Arms). Frederick Warne, London and New York, 1983.
 A.C. Fox-Davies. A Complete Guide to Heraldry (revised by J P Brooke-Little, Richmond Herald). Thomas Nelson and Sons, London, 1969.
 A.C. Fox-Davies. The Art of Heraldry: An Encyclopædia of Armory. Bloomsbury Books. London. 1986 (first published 1904).
 Kevin Greaves. A Canadian Heraldic Primer. The Heraldry Society of Canada, Ottawa, 2000.
 Sir Thomas Innes of Learney, Lord Lyon King of Arms. Scots Heraldry (revised Malcolm R Innes of Edingight, Marchmont Herald). Johnston and Bacon, London and Edinburgh, 1978.
 Alexander Nisbet. A system of heraldry. T&A Constable. Edinburgh.1984(first published 1722)
 Sir James Balfour Paul, Lord Lyon King of Arms. An Ordinary of Arms Contained in the Public Register of All Arms and Bearings in Scotland. W. Green & Sons. Edinburgh. 1903.
 David Reid of Robertland and Vivien Wilson. An Ordinary of Arms, volume 2 [1902-1973]. Lyon Office. Edinburgh. 1977.
 Urquhart, R M . Scottish Civic Heraldry: Regional - Islands - District. Heraldry Today. London. 1979.

External links 
 Heraldry Society of Scotland: members' arms
 Heraldry Society of Scotland: civic heraldry
 The Public Register of Arms, Flags and Badges of Canada online
 United States Army Institute of Heraldry
 The Royal Heraldry Society of Canada's online Members' Roll of Arms
 Civic Heraldry of England and Wales website
  Armoria Patriae: State Arms in South Africa
 South African Bureau of Heraldry database (via National Archives of South Africa)
 James Parker A Glossary of Terms Used in Heraldry (online version) Saitou, hard copy first published 1894

Heraldic ordinaries